The Port Authority of New South Wales, is a corporation owned by the State Government of New South Wales, Australia. The Port Authority acts as harbourmaster at the State's six commercial seaports, managing shipping movements, safety, security and emergency response. While major cargo handling facilities are operated by the private sector, the Port Authority continues to manage smaller facilities including Sydney's two cruise terminals, at Circular Quay and White Bay; common user berths at Sydney's Glebe Island and White Bay; and the regional ports at Eden and Yamba.

Formation 

Newcastle Port Corporation (NPC) was established on 1 July 1995 with the corporatisation of the Hunter Ports Authority, a subsidiary of the Maritime Services Board. In May 2013, the NSW Government sold long-term leases over Port Botany, owned by Sydney Ports Corporation, and Port Kembla, owned by Port Kembla Port Corporation. The corporations retained harbourmaster and maritime safety functions, but were unprofitable in their initial form.

Twelve months later, when the Port of Newcastle was leased, the lessons from Botany and Kembla were applied, leaving a profitable residual NPC. On 1 July 2014, the residual Newcastle, Sydney and Port Kembla port corporations were amalgamated into the "Port Authority of New South Wales".

Facilities

Overseas Passenger Terminal

White Bay Cruise Terminal

Port of Eden 

The Port of Eden is located in Twofold Bay on the State's far south coast.

The most easterly wharf services the woodchip mill. Usually two ships per month use the wharf. The forestry industry plays a significant role in the region. The Eden woodchip mill is owned by South East Fibre Exports (SEFE), a subsidiary of Japan's biggest paper manufacturer, Nippon Paper Industries.

The second wharf belongs to the Department of Defence and is used by the Royal Australian Navy to service its ships. Parallel to the woodchip mill is a naval munitions storage depot. It is a multi-purpose wharf which allows other vessels, including cruise ships, to also moor at the wharf when the Naval ships are not using it.

Mussel farming occupies the westerly part of the bay off the small peninsula between Cattle Bay and Quarantine Bay.

Port of Yamba 

The Port of Yamba is located in the estuary of the Clarence River, on the State's north coast, and is the easternmost port in mainland Australia.

See also 

 Bays Precinct
 Coffs Harbour
 Jervis Bay
 Port Macquarie

References

External links 
 

Port authorities in Australia
Government-owned companies of New South Wales
Companies based in Sydney
Transport in Sydney
Transport companies established in 1995
Australian companies established in 1995